The Great Singapore Sale (often abbreviated as GSS or Malay: Jualan Raksasa Singapura, Chinese: 新加坡热卖会, Tamil: மாபெரும் சிங்கப்பூர் விற்பனை) is a shopping event that happens annually in Singapore. Although it is called a sale, the Great Singapore Sale is in fact an event that is organised by the Singapore Retailers Association, and co-organised by stores and malls to promote the tourism industry in Singapore.

In 2013, MasterCard Singapore launched the Princess Singapore Campaign where they collaborated with famous Singapore bloggers to promote the initiative. That year, over US$1.5 billion was spent by MasterCard Cardholders during the Great Singapore Sale 2013.

In 2020, due to the circuit breaker measures as a result of COVID-19 pandemic in Singapore, the Great Singapore Sale was cancelled on 3 May and moved online as e-GSS from 24 August, making it the first online GSS in its 26-year-run.

In 2021, The Great Singapore Sale teamed up with online shopping platform Lazada Group and transformed the retail scene.

References

External links 

 Lazada Great Singapore Sale

Recurring events established in 1994
Retailing in Singapore
1994 establishments in Singapore